The Old Scholars Football Association is an Australian rules football competition in southern Tasmania, Australia. 
The competition currently stages an eighteen-round roster season which is cut to a top four at the end of the roster series for a four match finals series played according to the McIntyre system, culminating in the grand final.

History
The former Tasmanian Amateur Football League (Southern Division) known also as the Southern Amateurs split into two divisions at the start of the 1981 season, forming a District division and an Old Scholars division. 
In 1987, the clubs in the TAFL (Old Scholars Division) broke away to form the Old Scholars Football Association. 
With the admission of the Richmond Football Club in 2001 and Channel Football Club in 2009, the competition saw the loss of New Town Old Scholars in 1995 and The Friends' School Old Boys Football Club (formed in 1934) in the 2005 season.

Current OSFA clubs

Timeline

Premiership winners

Tasmanian Amateurs Old Scholars Division
1981 – Hutchins'
1982 – Old Hobartians Association (OHA)
1983 – Hutchins'
1984 – Dominic Old Scholars (DOSA)
1985 – Tasmanian University
1986 – Dominic Old Scholars (DOSA)
Old Scholars Football Assoc
1987 – Dominic Old Scholars (DOSA)
1988 – Old Hobartians Association (OHA)
1989 – Friends'
1990 – Friends'
1991 – Friends'
1992 – Tasmanian University

1993 – Tasmanian University
1994 – Dominic Old Scholars (DOSA)
1995 – Dominic Old Scholars (DOSA)
1996 – St Virgil's
1997 – Friends'
1998 – St Virgil's
1999 – Dominic Old Scholars (DOSA)
2000 – Hutchins'
2001 – St Virgil's
2002 – Hutchins'
2003 – Hutchins'
2004 – Richmond
2005 – Richmond
2006 – Hutchins'
2007 – Hutchins'

2008 – Old Hobartians Association (OHA)
2009 – Richmond
2010 – Hutchins' 
2011 – Old Hobartians Association (OHA)
2012 – Hutchins'
2013 – Dominic Old Scholars (DOSA)
2014 – Hutchins'
2015 – Richmond 
2016 – Tasmanian University
2017 – Richmond
2018 – Dominic Old Scholars (DOSA)
2019 – Dominic Old Scholars (DOSA)
2020 – Old Hobartians Association (OHA)
2021 – Old Hobartians Association (OHA) 
2022 – Hutchins'

2016 Ladder

2017 Ladder

2018 Ladder

2019 Ladder

2020 Ladder

Notes

External links
 Old Scholars Football Association website
 Tasmanian University Football Club website
 Old Hobartians Association website
 OSFA Sporting Pulse page

Australian rules football competitions in Tasmania
Sports leagues established in 1987